John Kennedy (fl. 1968, 2009) is an Irish television personality. He is the father of presenter Lucy Kennedy, whom he accompanies as a pianist on the 2009 RTÉ2 chat show The Lucy Kennedy Show. He is also known for composing Ireland's entry in the Eurovision Song Contest 1968. "Chance of a Lifetime", performed by Pat McGeegan, placed fourth in the competition but topped the Irish Singles Chart.

References

External links 
 The Lucy Kennedy Show site 
 Irish Eurovision entries

Irish songwriters
Irish television personalities
Living people
Year of birth missing (living people)
Place of birth missing (living people)